Nitrogen fluoride can refer to:

 Nitrogen trifluoride, NF3
 Nitrogen difluoride radical, ·NF2
 Nitrogen monofluoride, NF
 Nitrogen pentafluoride, NF5
 Dinitrogen difluoride, N2F2
 Tetrafluorohydrazine, N2F4
 Fluorine azide, N3F
 Tetrafluoroammonium, NF4+

Nitrogen fluorides
Nitrogen compounds
Fluorides